The pygmy white-eye (Heleia squamifrons), also known as the pygmy ibon, is a species of bird in the white-eye family Zosteropidae.

Distribution and habitat
It is endemic to the hill forest and lower montane forest of northern Borneo.

Behaviour
It feeds on small berries, fruits, seeds and insects, foraging in small flocks of 4 to 8 birds. It will associate with other birds when feeding, including other white-eyes, cuckoo-doves, yuhinas and erpornises. The species is common but inconspicuous.

References

 

pygmy white-eye
Birds of East Malaysia
Endemic birds of Borneo
pygmy white-eye
Taxa named by Richard Bowdler Sharpe
Taxonomy articles created by Polbot